Lydie Denier (born 15 April 1964) is a French-American model and actress. She has appeared in numerous TV series and films.

Biography

Early life

She was born in Pontchâteau, France. Denier was raised in Martinique, attending school at the Lycee Shoelcher in Fort-de-France.

Career
When she was 14 she became a model, appearing in magazines including Vogue and ELLE. She began traveling the world when she was 16 years old, spending time in Africa, the Caribbean, and Germany, where she got her first record deal with Polygram, singing ballads.

She visited Los Angeles on vacation and decided to stay and pursue an acting career. She began appearing in videos and commercials while she refined her English skills and studied acting. In 1988 she had her first feature film appearance in the US in Bulletproof, with Gary Busey. She appeared in several TV series, most notably General Hospital, The Flash and Starman, among others. In 1991 she guest starred in Baywatch.

In 1991, she had another big break when she was cast as Jane Porter for the Tarzán series. She came to the attention of Zalman King, who cast her for a role in Wild Orchid II: Two Shades of Blue as well as an appearance in the Red Shoe Diaries series. In 1996, after appearances in Silk Stalkings, Tarzan: The Epic Adventures, Conan the Adventurer, and The New Adventures of Robin Hood, she was cast as a spy in the series Acapulco H.E.A.T.

In 2000, she released her own calendar. She continues to appear in films and television shows such as Spin City, Gilmore Girls, and Hammerhead.

She lives in Laguna Beach, California, where she is a naturalized U.S. citizen.

Partial filmography
 Starman: "The Return" (1986) as Darcy
 Paramedics (1988) as Liette
 Blood Relations (1988) as Marie 
 Bulletproof (1988) as Tracy
 General Hospital (1989) as Dr. Yasmine Bernoudi
 China Beach (two episodes, 1989–1990) as Danielle
 Satan's Princess (1990) as Nicole St. James
 The Flash: "Honor Among Thieves" (1990) as Kate Tatting
 Wild Orchid II: Two Shades of Blue (1991) as Dominique
 Baywatch (1991) as French Stewardess
 Tarzán (1991–1994) as Jane Porter (Tarzan)
 Red Shoe Diaries: "Talk to Me Baby" (1992) as Elaine
 Invasion of Privacy (1992 film) as Vicky
 Perfect Alibi as Jeannine
 Melrose Place Season 4 one episode 1996 Dead Sisters Walking
 Tarzan: The Epic Adventures (1996–1997) as Olga de Coude
 Silk Stalkings: "Night of the Parrot" (1997) as Danielle
 Conan the Adventurer (1997) as Katrina
 The New Adventures of Robin Hood: episodes: "Orphans" (1998) as Emily, the maidand "The Assassin" (1998) as Countess Emily Du Monde
 Acapulco H.E.A.T. (1998–1999) as Nicole
 Spin City: "A Tale of Four Cities" (2002) as Simone
 Gilmore Girls: "Korean Thanksgiving" (2002) as Monique Clemenceau
 Hammerhead: Shark Frenzy (2005) as Doctor Mendoveko

References

External links
 
 

1964 births
Living people
People from Saint-Nazaire
French expatriates in the United States
Martiniquais female models
French film actresses
French television actresses
French female models
20th-century French actresses
21st-century French actresses
20th-century American actresses
21st-century American actresses
French emigrants to the United States
Naturalized citizens of the United States
American film actresses
American television actresses
American female models